Ruby Ellen Fox (born August 11, 1945 in Los Angeles, California) is a former American sports shooter and Olympic silver medalist.  At the 1984 Summer Olympics in Los Angeles, California, she won a silver medal in the women's 25 metre pistol competition. At the 1988 Summer Olympics, she place 26th in the 25 metre pistol competition and tied for 22nd place in the 10 metre air pistol competition.

References

External links
 

1945 births
Living people
American female sport shooters
United States Distinguished Marksman
ISSF pistol shooters
Shooters at the 1984 Summer Olympics
Shooters at the 1988 Summer Olympics
Olympic silver medalists for the United States in shooting
Medalists at the 1984 Summer Olympics
Pan American Games medalists in shooting
Pan American Games gold medalists for the United States
Shooters at the 1987 Pan American Games
Medalists at the 1987 Pan American Games
21st-century American women